Niltava (from niltau, Nepali for N. sundara) is a genus of passerine birds in the Old World flycatcher family Muscicapidae.

The genus contains the following seven species:

 Fujian niltava (Niltava davidi)
 Rufous-bellied niltava (Niltava sundara)
 Rufous-vented niltava (Niltava sumatrana)
Chinese vivid niltava (Niltava oatesi)
 Taiwan vivid niltava (Niltava vivida)
 Large niltava (Niltava grandis)
 Small niltava (Niltava macgrigoriae)

References

 Del Hoyo, J.; Elliot, A. & Christie D. (editors). (2006). Handbook of the Birds of the World. Volume 11: Old World Flycatchers to Old World Warblers. Lynx Edicions. .

 
Bird genera
 
Taxonomy articles created by Polbot